Diamond ring nebula may refer to:

 Abell 33
 Abell 70